The five arrondissements of the Bas-Rhin department are:
 Arrondissement of Haguenau-Wissembourg, (subprefecture: Haguenau) with 141 communes. The population of the arrondissement was 240,807 in 2016.  
 Arrondissement of Molsheim, (subprefecture: Molsheim) with 77 communes. The population of the arrondissement was 103,633 in 2016.  
 Arrondissement of Saverne, (subprefecture: Saverne) with 162 communes. The population of the arrondissement was 129,095 in 2016.
 Arrondissement of Sélestat-Erstein, (subprefecture: Sélestat) with 101 communes. The population of the arrondissement was 156,463 in 2016.  
 Arrondissement of Strasbourg, (prefecture of the Bas-Rhin department: Strasbourg) with 33 communes. The population of the arrondissement was 491,409 in 2016.

History

In 1800 the arrondissements of Strasbourg, Barr, Saverne and Wissembourg were established. In 1806 Sélestat replaced Barr as subprefecture. In 1871 the department was ceded to Germany. In 1919 the department of Bas-Rhin was restored, with the arrondissements of Strasbourg-Ville, Strasbourg-Campagne, Erstein, Haguenau, Molsheim, Saverne, Sélestat and Wissembourg. In 1974 the arrondissements of Erstein and Sélestat were merged into the new arrondissement of Sélestat-Erstein. 

The borders of the arrondissements of Bas-Rhin were modified in January 2015:
 all 56 communes of the former arrondissement of Haguenau to the new arrondissement of Haguenau-Wissembourg
 two communes from the arrondissement of Saverne to the new arrondissement of Haguenau-Wissembourg
 seven communes from the arrondissement of Saverne to the arrondissement of Molsheim
 18 communes of the former arrondissement of Strasbourg-Campagne to the new arrondissement of Haguenau-Wissembourg
 one commune of the former arrondissement of Strasbourg-Campagne to the arrondissement of Molsheim
 53 communes of the former arrondissement of Strasbourg-Campagne to the arrondissement of Saverne
 32 communes of the former arrondissement of Strasbourg-Campagne to the new arrondissement of Strasbourg
 the only commune of the former arrondissement of Strasbourg-Ville to the new arrondissement of Strasbourg
 all 68 communes of the former arrondissement of Wissembourg to the new arrondissement of Haguenau-Wissembourg

References

Bas-Rhin